Christian Jalon Massinburg (born April 14, 1997) is an American professional basketball player for Pallacanestro Brescia of Lega Basket Serie A. He played college basketball for the Buffalo Bulls. He was named the 2019 Mid-American Conference Player of the Year. He previously played for the Long Island Nets of the NBA G League and Limoges CSP of the LNB Pro A.

Early life and high school career
Born and raised in Dallas, Massinburg came to Buffalo from South Oak Cliff High School. As a senior, he averaged 22.3 points per game, but initially received no NCAA Division I offers. He ultimately signed with the Bulls after being scouted playing on a travel team for unsigned seniors.

College career
In his freshman season, Massinburg was not expected to contribute much, but ended up playing a key role off the bench averaging 11.3 points and 4.1 rebounds per game, earning a spot on the Mid-American Conference (MAC) All-Freshman Team. As a sophomore, Massinburg's progress was slowed by missing the first eight games of the season due to a bout with mononucleosis, but he improved his scoring to 14.5 points per game as he moved into the starting lineup. As a junior, Massinburg was named first-team All-MAC as the Bulls enjoyed regular-season and Tournament conference championships, earning a trip to the 2018 NCAA tournament. Massinburg scored 19 points in the Bulls' upset over 4-seed Arizona in the NCAA Tournament's first round, thought to be the biggest win in program history at the time.

As a senior, Buffalo was the overwhelming preseason choice to win the MAC and Massinburg was named preseason first-team All-MAC East. The Bulls experienced great team success, as the team achieved a top 25 ranking in the November 12, 2018 AP Poll, signifying a first for the school. The Bulls would go on to maintain a spot in the top 25 for the remainder of the year. Massinburg led the team in scoring, moving into the school's top five all-time scoring list on January 29, 2019. He received national individual recognition as he was named to thee watch lists for several national Player of the Year awards. Massinburg closed the 2018–19 regular season averaging 18.5 points per game and winning MAC Player of the Year honors and repeating on the all-conference first team.

The Buffalo News named Massinburg the best player of the decade from Buffalo, Canisius, Niagara, or St. Bonaventure. He was also named to the Lou Henson Award All-Decade Team.

Professional career

Long Island Nets (2019–2021) 
On October 15, 2019, Massinburg signed with the Brooklyn Nets of the National Basketball Association (NBA). On October 18, the Nets waived Massinburg. He was ultimately added to the roster of the Nets’ NBA G League affiliate, the Long Island Nets. On November 15, Massinburg contributed 28 points, six rebounds and three assists in a loss to the Delaware Blue Coats. He missed a game against the Canton Charge on December 30 for undisclosed reasons. Massinburg missed more than a month of action due to a right knee injury before returning against the Grand Rapids Drive on January 27, 2020.

Limoges CSP (2021–2022) 
On September 14, 2021, Massinburg was signed by Limoges CSP of the LNB Pro A, the top tier men's basketball league in France.

Pallacanestro Brescia (2022–present) 
In June 2022, Massinburg signed a 2 year contract with Pallacanestro Brescia of Lega Basket Serie A.

The Basketball Tournament 
Massinburg has played in The Basketball Tournament (TBT), an annual $1 million winner-take-all tournament, for Blue Collar U, a team primarily rostered with Buffalo alumni. In TBT 2021, the team made it to the semifinals of the tournament. In TBT 2022, Blue Collar U won the tournament and $1 million prize, with Massinburg being named tournament MVP.

Career statistics

College

|-
| style="text-align:left;"|2015–16
| style="text-align:left;"|Buffalo
| 35 || 7 || 25.3 || .447 || .389 || .752 || 4.1 || 1.7 || 1.1 || .4 || 11.3
|-
| style="text-align:left;"|2016–17 
| style="text-align:left;"|Buffalo
| 24 || 18 || 32.4 || .411 || .331 || .750 || 5.6 || 2.8 || .6 || .1 || 14.5
|-
| style="text-align:left;"|2017–18 
| style="text-align:left;"|Buffalo 
| 36 || 35 || 34.0 || .468 || .405 || .743 || 7.3 || 2.4 || 1.1 || .4 || 17.0
|-
| style="text-align:left;"|2018–19
| style="text-align:left;"|Buffalo
| 35 || 34 || 32.1 || .464 || .399 || .780 || 6.5 || 3.0 || 1.2 || .3 || 18.2
|- class="sortbottom"
| style="text-align:center;" colspan="2"|Career
| 130 || 94 || 30.8 || .452 || .386 || .757 || 5.9 || 2.4 || 1.1 || .3 || 15.3

References

External links
Buffalo Bulls bio
College stats @ basketball-reference.com

1997 births
Living people
American men's basketball players
Basketball players from Dallas
Buffalo Bulls men's basketball players
Limoges CSP players
Long Island Nets players
Shooting guards
American expatriate basketball people in Italy
African-American basketball players